The Colombian Cycling Federation or FCC is the national governing body of cycle racing in Colombia.

The FCC is a member of the UCI and COPACI.

External links
 

Cycle racing organizations
Cycle racing in Colombia
Cycling